Him Lam is a ward (phường) of Điện Biên Phủ in Điện Biên Province of northwestern Vietnam.

Communes of Điện Biên province
Populated places in Điện Biên province
Dien Bien Phu